Lorena Olivia Delgado Varas (born 1974) is a Swedish politician and member of the Riksdag, the national legislature. A member of the Left Party, she has represented Stockholm Municipality since September 2018.

Delgado Varas is the daughter of mechanical engineer Daniel Delgado and preschool teacher Olivia Varas Acosta. She was educated in Temuco in Chile and studied chemical engineering at KTH Royal Institute of Technology. She was quality assistant at Fresenius Kabi in 2010 and has been a quality engineer at AstraZeneca since 2011. She was a member of the municipal council in Stockholm Municipality between 2014 and 2018.

References

1974 births
KTH Royal Institute of Technology alumni
Living people
Members of the Riksdag 2018–2022
Members of the Riksdag 2022–2026
Members of the Riksdag from the Left Party (Sweden)
People from Stockholm
Women members of the Riksdag
21st-century Swedish women politicians